Willie Jones is an American college basketball coach. He was most recently the head coach for North Carolina A&T Aggies from 2019 to 2022. Jones became the interim coach of the Aggies on December 24, 2019 for Jay Joyner, when the team was a member of the Mid-Eastern Athletic Conference (MEAC), and led the team to a 14-5 overall record and a second place MEAC finish. Jones was named MEAC Coach of the Year for the 2019–20 season.

Jones was elevated to the head coach spot on June 18, 2020. On August 18, 2022, Jones was fired and succeeded by assistant coach Phillip Shumpert.

References

Year of birth missing (living people)
Living people
American men's basketball coaches
American men's basketball players
College men's basketball head coaches in the United States
Florida A&M Rattlers basketball coaches
Georgia Southern Eagles men's basketball coaches
High school basketball coaches in Florida
Jacksonville Dolphins men's basketball coaches
Junior college men's basketball coaches in the United States
LeMoyne–Owen Magicians basketball coaches
North Carolina A&T Aggies men's basketball coaches
South Carolina State Bulldogs basketball coaches
South Carolina State Bulldogs basketball players
Tennessee State University alumni